Mosillus is a genus of shore flies in the family Ephydridae.

Species

M. asiaticus Mathis, Zatwarnicki & Krivosheina, 1993
M. beckeri (Cresson, 1925)
M. bidentatus (Cresson, 1926)
M. bracteatus Schiner, 1868
M. frontina (Costa, 1854)
M. gutticosta (Walker, 1856)
M. infusus (Walker, 1856)
M. stegmaieri Wirth, 1969
M. subsultans (Fabricius, 1794)
M. tibialis Cresson, 1916

References

Ephydridae
Brachycera genera
Diptera of Europe
Diptera of Africa
Diptera of Asia
Diptera of North America
Taxa named by Pierre André Latreille